Vasyl Valentinovich Bobrovnikov (born November 8, 1971), is a Ukrainian retired professional ice hockey player. He mainly played for Sokil Kyiv in Ukraine. He played internationally for the Ukrainian national team at several World Championships, as well as the 2002 Winter Olympics.

Career statistics

Regular season and playoffs

International

External links
 

1971 births
Living people
HC Berkut-Kyiv players
HK ATEK Kyiv players
Ice hockey players at the 2002 Winter Olympics
Olympic ice hockey players of Ukraine
ShVSM Kyiv players
Sokil Kyiv players
Soviet ice hockey left wingers
Sportspeople from Kyiv
Torpedo Nizhny Novgorod players
Ukrainian ice hockey left wingers